The grass-in-ear behavior, object-in-ear behavior or grass-in-the-ear technique is a fashion statement-like behavior that some chimpanzees do. The unusual behavior has been named by scientists, and it appears to be one of the first times that chimpanzees have created a tradition that has no discernible purpose.

History 
It was first documented in 2010 in the Zambian Chimfunshi Wildlife Orphanage sanctuary's grassy territory when a chimpanzee named Julie stuck a piece of grass into her ear, and left it there. But after Julie did it, other chimpanzees in her group began to follow suit. According to experts, this proves that chimpanzees have already taken the evolutionary journey towards the advanced apes like humans.

Relationship between chimpanzees and grasses 
Chimpanzees use grass as a tool when they are ant fishing to extract carpenter ants from their nests in living trees or dead wood.

References 

Behavior
Chimpanzees
Fashion
Grasses